The Würth-Literaturpreis was a German literary prize from 1996 to 2019 and was awarded a total of 30 times.

References

External links
 

German literary awards